Solvent detergent plasma is a form of blood plasma made from plasma collected from many people which is then processed with solvents as a form of virus processing, to try to get rid of viruses.

References

Blood
Transfusion medicine

Blood products